"Sad but True" is a song by American heavy metal band Metallica. It was released in February 1993 as the fifth and final single from their 1991 self-titled album. The music video for the single was released in October 1992.

Music 
Sad but True is in D Standard tuning, however the song was originally written and demoed in E Standard.  Bob Rock, who produced The Black Album, recalled to Musicradar.com: "We were in pre-production, which was uncomfortable because nobody had ever made them go through their songs in such a deliberate way before, and six songs in 'Sad But True' came along. Suddenly, I realized that every song, including this one, was in the key of E.  I brought this to the band's attention, and they said, 'Well, isn't E the lowest note?' So I told them that on Mötley Crüe's Dr. Feelgood, which I produced and Metallica loved, the band had tuned down to D. Metallica then tuned down to D, and that's when the riff really became huge. It was this force that you just couldn't stop, no matter what."

Rock, Hetfield, and Ulrich are all credited as producers, and Randy Staub and his assistant, Mike Tacci.

Track listing
US single
 "Sad but True"
 "So What?"

International single part 1
 "Sad but True" – 5:27
 "So What?" – 3:09
 "Harvester of Sorrow" (live) – 6:41

International single part 2
 "Sad but True" – 5:27
 "Nothing Else Matters (Elevator Version)" – 6:31
 "Creeping Death" (live) – 8:01
 "Sad but True" (demo) – 4:53

UK picture single
 "Sad but True" – 5:26
 "Nothing Else Matters" (live) – 6:13
 "Sad but True" (live) – 6:12

UK and German 7-inch single
 "Sad but True" – 5:24
 "Nothing Else Matters" – 6:29

French single
 "Sad but True" – 5:27
 "Nothing Else Matters (Edit)" – 6:29

International 7-inch single
 "Sad but True"
 "Nothing Else Matters" (live)
 "Sad but True" (live)

Personnel
 James Hetfield – lead vocals, rhythm guitar
 Kirk Hammett – lead guitar
 Jason Newsted – bass, backing vocals
 Lars Ulrich – drums
 John Marshall – guitar on "Nothing Else Matters" (live)

Charts

Certifications

Cover versions
In 2020, the Mongolian hunnu band The HU released a cover of the song translated entirely into Mongolian.

The Metallica Blacklist, a compilation album released in 2021, features seven covers of the song, including a live version by Sam Fender and studio versions by Jason Isbell and the 400 Unit, Mexican Institute of Sound, Royal Blood, St. Vincent, White Reaper and YB.

References

1991 songs
1993 singles
Metallica songs
Songs written by James Hetfield
Songs written by Lars Ulrich
Song recordings produced by Bob Rock
Number-one singles in Finland
Music videos directed by Wayne Isham
Elektra Records singles